The Dangol or Dongol (Nepal Bhasa: डंगोल) clan are ethnic people in Newar community from Kathmandu Valley, predominantly found in Kathmandu, Nepal. They belong to the Jyapu (Nepal Bhasa: ज्यापू:) subcaste within the Newar family and are highly urbanized. In the olden times, they were farmers known for the knowledge of the measurement of land and calculation. Also, they have some distinct cultures and customs a bit different from other Newar traditions. 

In order to protect the girl from being a widow, who is looked down upon by the rest of Nepal. If the woman's husband dies, she is still technically married to the sun and can hence not be called a widow, a tradition hence defying Sati Pratha imposed by the new-comers, rulers of Vedic lineage.

Examples of last names: 

Dangol or Dongol (depends on personal preference)

Some Famous Figures

 Sarbottam Dangol (Unified Communist Party of Nepal (Maoist- Tirtha Ram Dangol (Nepali Congress)
 Dr. Purushottam Dangol (Structural Engineer)
Purushottam Dangol (Architect, Author)
Pooja Dangol (Business Consultant and Trainer)
Karmath Dangol (Vice President of Engineering, Tech)
Hira Dangol  (Vice President Engineering, Investor & Executive)
Labib Dangol (Director of Accounting Operations, Defense Advanced Research Projects Agency (DARPA)
Anjana Dongol (Associate Professor, Kathmandu University School of Medical Sciences)
Avinash Dangol (Business Travel Consultant and Mentor (CWT)

See also
 Newar caste system
 Maharjan,

References

https://nepalfederalismdebate.wordpress.com/2018/06/24/master-list-of-all-nepali-surnames-clans/ 
https://www.indigenousvoice.com/en/why-jyapus-are-where-they-are.html 
http://ecs.com.np/features/preservers-of-newar-culture-jyapus-of-the-valley

Newar
Newar caste system
Social groups of Nepal
People from Kathmandu